Fragilicetus is an extinct genus of rorqual from Early Pliocene deposits in Belgium.

Description
Fragilicetus exhibits a combination of balaenopterid features (shape of the supraorbital process of the frontal and significant details of the temporal fossa) and those found in Cetotheriidae and Eschrichtiidae (squamosal bulge and posteriorly protruded exoccipital).

References

Prehistoric cetacean genera
Fossil taxa described in 2016
Pliocene cetaceans